Paul Oliver Hill (born 2 March 1995) is a professional rugby union footballer who plays at prop for Premiership club Northampton Saints.

Club career
Although born in Germany, Hill was raised in Doncaster and played his junior rugby at Doncaster Knights, before moving to Yorkshire Carnegie's academy, making his senior debut in 2014. On 17 April 2015 he joined Northampton Saints to compete in the Premiership from the 2015-16 season. Hill started for the Northampton side that defeated Saracens in the final of the 2019 Premiership Rugby Cup.

International career
Hill has represented England at age ranges from U16 to U20 levels. He started for the England under-20 team that defeated South Africa in the final of the 2014 IRB Junior World Championship at Eden Park. Hill scored a try against Scotland during the 2015 Six Nations Under 20s Championship which England won. Later that year he started for the side that lost to New Zealand in the final of the 2015 World Rugby Under 20 Championship.

On 13 January 2016 Hill received his first call-up to the senior England squad by new coach Eddie Jones for the 2016 Six Nations Championship. Hill made his senior England debut when he came on as a replacement for Dan Cole against Italy on 14 February 2016. This was his only appearance during the tournament which saw England complete a grand slam. In the summer of 2016 Hill won his second cap against Wales and he then subsequently featured off the bench in all three tests of their tour of Australia which saw England complete a series whitewash. 

Hill was selected for the 2017 tour of Argentina however a neck injury sustained whilst representing his club forced him to withdraw. In July 2021 Hill played for England against Canada in what was his first Test appearance since the 2016 tour of Australia.

References

External links
Northampton Saints Profile
ESPN scrum Profile

1995 births
Living people
English rugby union players
Rugby union props
Leeds Tykes players
Northampton Saints players
England international rugby union players
People educated at Prince Henry's Grammar School, Otley
Sportspeople from Doncaster